Notiophilus  substriatus  is a species of ground beetle native to Europe.

References

External links
Images representing Notiophilus substriatus  at Barcode of Life Data System

Notiophilus
Beetles described in 1833
Beetles of Europe